The Hierarchical internetworking model is a three-layer model for network design first proposed by Cisco. It divides enterprise networks into three layers: core, distribution, and access layer.

Access layer
End-stations and servers connect to the enterprise at the access layer. Access layer devices are usually commodity switching platforms, and may or may not provide layer 3 switching services. The traditional focus at the access layer is minimizing "cost-per-port": the amount of investment the enterprise must make for each provisioned Ethernet port. This layer is also called the desktop layer because it focuses on connecting client nodes, such as workstations to the network.

Distribution layer
The distribution layer is the smart layer in the three-layer model. Routing, filtering, and QoS policies are managed at the distribution layer. Distribution layer devices also often manage individual branch-office WAN connections. This layer is also called the Workgroup layer.

Core layer
The core is the backbone of a network, where the internet(internetwork) gateway are located. The core network provides high-speed, highly redundant forwarding services to move packets between distribution-layer devices in different regions of the network. Core switches and routers are usually the most powerful, in terms of raw forwarding power, in the enterprise; core network devices manage the highest-speed connections, such as 10 Gigabit Ethernet or 100 Gigabit Ethernet.

See also
 Multi-tier architecture
 Service layer

References
 
 

Computer_networking
Reference models